Matt Johnson is a Canadian actor and filmmaker. He is known for his independent feature films, including The Dirties (2013), which won Best Narrative Feature at the Slamdance Film Festival, and Operation Avalanche (2016), which premiered at the Sundance Film Festival.

Career

2007–2009: Early work 
He is known for creating, writing and starring in the low-budget web series Nirvanna the Band the Show from 2007 to 2009.

2013–2014: The Dirties 

Johnson achieved widespread critical acclaim in Canada with his first feature film The Dirties. which won Best Narrative Feature at the Slamdance Film Festival. He was a Canadian Screen Award nominee for Best Editing at the 2nd Canadian Screen Awards in 2014 for The Dirties.

The film had a production budget of $10,000. After finishing production, an additional $45,000 was needed to secure licensing rights for the music used in the film. All the film's financing came "out of pocket."

There was almost no scripted dialogue and several scenes were shot without some of the participants' awareness.

2016: Operation Avalanche 

Operation Avalanche premiered at the Sundance Film Festival. Johnson had received an offer to premiere the film at the Toronto International Film Festival but declined, reasoning that the film would be lost in the large number of films shown there. Lionsgate released it in the US on September 16, 2016. He was nominated for Best Director at the 5th Canadian Screen Awards in 2017 for his work on Operation Avalanche.

Rotten Tomatoes, a review aggregator, reports that 69% of 51 surveyed critics gave the film a positive review; the average rating is 6.4/10. Metacritic rated it 69/100 score based on 18 reviews.  Peter Debruge of Variety wrote, "Matt Johnson and Owen Williams' wild, borderline-illegal stunt delivers big time on its crazy premise."  John DeFore of The Hollywood Reporter called it a "likeable if not always convincing fantasy that gets much mileage from its period feel".  Anthony Kaufman of Screen Daily wrote that the film "comes across more as a rambling lark than a tightly conceived film".

2016–2018: Nirvanna the Band the Show 

Nirvanna the Band the Show was re-mastered and re-launched at the Toronto International Film Festival and subsequently as a television series on Viceland in fall 2016. The show stars Johnson and Jay McCarrol as "Nirvanna the Band," two hapless lifelong best friends and roommates, who engage in a series of complex publicity stunts around their home city of Toronto in the hopes of landing a gig at The Rivoli, despite the fact that they have never actually written or recorded a single song, nor taken any other steps to get their band ready.

Other
In addition to his own productions, he has had acting roles in feature films such as Diamond Tongues, How Heavy This Hammer and Anne at 13,000 Ft..

Johnson made an animated sequel to Nirvanna the Band the Show called Matt & Bird Break Loose in 2021.

In 2022, Johnson directed the forthcoming film BlackBerry, about the rise and fall of Canadian tech company Research in Motion. The film stars Glenn Howerton as Jim Balsillie, and Jay Baruchel as Mike Lazaridis.

References

External links

Film directors from Toronto
Living people
Canadian male film actors
Canadian male television actors
Canadian film editors
1985 births
21st-century Canadian male actors
Canadian male television writers
Canadian male screenwriters
Canadian television writers
Male actors from Toronto
Writers from Toronto
21st-century Canadian screenwriters
21st-century Canadian male writers
York University alumni